Euryplocia is a genus of beetles in the family Cerambycidae, containing the following species:

 Euryplocia salomonum Breuning, 1956
 Euryplocia striatipennis Breuning, 1939

References

Apomecynini
Cerambycidae genera
Taxa named by Stephan von Breuning (entomologist)